Rapid Angel (shown on the box cover and title screen as The Rapid Angel) is an anime beat 'em up by Techno Soleil for the PlayStation. It was released in Japan on August 13, 1998. The player plays as three delivery girls who must manage to defeat enemies and deliver goods within a time limit.

Plot 
Three delivery girls named Natsumi, Ayane and Haruna work for a delivery company called "Rapid Angel".

Gameplay 
Rapid Angel is a side scrolling brawler. There are three selectable characters, and each of the three delivery girls has their own attack technique. The game contains a two player mode where the second player can act as a support unit for the first player.

Reception 
Upon its release in 1998, Famitsu magazine gave it a score of 19 out of 40. Famitsu compared the game to Final Fight, but lacking depth.

Legacy
The game was re-released for the PlayStation Network in 2009, where it retailed for 600 yen. And in 2011 it was released for PSN imports outside of Japan. There was no localization or translation for the release, and all the audio and text was presented in Japanese.

References

1998 in video gaming
PlayStation (console) games
PlayStation Network games
Video games developed in Japan
Video games scored by Satoshi Miyashita
Beat 'em ups
Single-player video games